The Țibău is a left tributary of the river Bistrița in Romania. It discharges into the Bistrița near the village Țibău.

Tributaries

The following rivers are tributaries to the river Țibău (from source to mouth):

Left: Râul Printre Stânci, Davriluvca, Râul Mare
Right: Ursul, Sâlhoi, Zambroslăviile, Canalul, Dârmocsa, Cudriava, Lelici

References

Rivers of Romania
Rivers of Suceava County
Rivers of Maramureș County